Elections to Trafford Council were held on 4 May 1990.  One-third of the council was up for election, with each successful candidate to serve a four-year term of office, expiring in 1994. The Conservative party retained overall control of the council.

After the election, the composition of the council was as follows:

Ward results

References

1990 English local elections
1990
1990s in Greater Manchester